Reclaiming is a modern witchcraft tradition, aiming to combine the Goddess movement with feminism and political activism (in the peace and anti-nuclear movements). Reclaiming was founded in 1979, in the context of the Reclaiming Collective (1978–1997), by two Neopagan women of Jewish descent, Starhawk and Diane Baker, in order to explore and develop feminist Neopagan emancipatory rituals.

Today, the organization focuses on progressive social, political, environmental and economic activism. Guided by a shared, "Principles of Unity, a document that lists the core values of the tradition: personal authority, inclusivity, social and environmental justice and a recognition of intersectionality".

History
Reclaiming originated in 1979 in the San Francisco Bay Area, blending the influences of Victor and Cora Anderson's Feri Tradition of Witchcraft, Dianic Witchcraft as taught by Z. Budapest, and the feminist, anarchist, peace, and environmental movements.

Researcher Rachel Morgain writes:

Influences and teachings
Reclaiming's spiritual approach is based in the feminist Goddess movement and matriarchal religion. On some levels Reclaiming has much in common with Wicca, and the Wiccan Charge of the Goddess is commonly utilised; part of it is quoted in Reclaiming's core agenda, known as "The Principles of Unity". However, given its focus on dismantling and resisting structures of power and domination, Reclaiming uses consensus process and non-hierarchical structure in its covens – there is no High Priest or High Priestess as there would be in an Alexandrian or Gardnerian witchcraft coven. Reclaiming members are encouraged to take an active part in co-creating group rituals.

Theologically, Reclaiming is very diverse and inclusive. The common thread is an active honoring and defending of the Earth, and a support of the Gaia hypothesis. Teaching and rituals, which are often focused on shamanic techniques such as guided meditation, trance work, shapeshifting and ecstatic dance (as in the Spiral dance, an iconic group dance often performed at rituals and at protest rallies), is empowering the individual and the community to take action. Reclaiming often uses chant as part of its rituals and has released numerous recordings of chants used in the movement. The embodiment of myth and fairytale in dramatic rituals (often done with spontaneity, a quality highly valued in the movement) which enact the cycle of the Seasons or the lessons of particular gods and goddesses are important in Reclaiming.

Reclaiming rituals are designed to encourage a spiritual way of life that blends respect for the earth and other living beings with a fuller sense of personal well-being and alignment with spiritual values. Starhawk and Valentine's handbook Twelve Wild Swans involves instructions for interpreting the tale of the book's title through both the 'inner' and 'outer' paths of personal and social transformation, the two paths being seen alike as necessary facets of the same overall project. Without a focus on healing the self, Reclaiming members believe people are certain to perpetuate the social ills they have internalised through the damage done by modernity. Their ritual work is thus focused as much on personal healing and transformation as on social justice.

Among the tradition's teachers are Starhawk, author of The Spiral Dance and several other books; T. Thorn Coyle, author of Evolutionary Witchcraft; Diane Baker and Anne Hill, co-authors of Circle Round: Raising Children in the Goddess Tradition (1998) and M. Macha Nightmare, co-author of The Pagan Book of Living and Dying.

Activities
Today, Reclaiming has several dozen affiliated communities across the U.S., Canada, Europe and Australia. Weeklong intensives called "Witchcamps" bring Reclaiming people together in about a dozen regions. Classes such as "Elements of Magic", "Rites of Passage", and specific meditative and magical techniques such as the "Pearl Pentacle" and the "Iron Pentacle" assist participants to share practical skills in personal empowerment and group process. Reclaiming has also produced several CDs of pagan chants and songs, and publishes the magazine Reclaiming Quarterly.

See also
 Feminism
 Modern paganism and New Age

References

Further reading
 Rachel Morgain. "Beyond 'Individualism': personhood and transformation in the Reclaiming pagan community of San Francisco". Anthropology thesis, Australian National University. Welcome to the School of Archaeology and Anthropology
 Rachel Morgain. (October 2012) "On the Use of the Uncanny in Ritual". Religion, 42:4, 521–548. Examines the uncanny within the context of Reclaiming rituals including 'the Wild Hunt'. On the use of the uncanny in ritual On the use of the uncanny in ritual
 Jone Salomonsen, Enchanted Feminism: The Reclaiming Witches of San Francisco (London and New York: Routledge, 2002) 
 T. Thorn Coyle, Evolutionary Witchcraft (Tarcher/Penguin, 2004)
 Starhawk and M. Macha Nightmare, The Pagan Book of Living and Dying (Harper/SF, 1997)
 Starhawk, author of The Spiral Dance and numerous other books – see Starhawk
 Margot Adler, Drawing Down the Moon: Witches, Druids Goddess-Worshippers and Other Pagans in America (Penguin, 2006)
 V. Vale, "Modern Pagans" (Re/Search, 2001)
 Victor and Cora Anderson, authors of numerous books about the Feri Tradition under the Harpy Books imprint

External links 
 Reclaiming Quarterly, a magical activism magazine

 
Modern pagan traditions
Feminist spirituality
Pacifist feminism
Modern pagan organizations based in the United States
Wicca in the United States